Fire Escape Collapse, also known as Fire on Marlborough Street, is a monochrome photograph by Stanley Forman which received the Pulitzer Prize for Spot News Photography in 1976 and the title of World Press Photo of the Year. The photograph, which is part of a series, shows 19-year-old Diana Bryant and her two-year-old goddaughter Tiare Jones falling from the collapsed fire escape of a burning apartment building on Marlborough Street in Boston on July 22, 1975.

The photo was taken with a motorized camera and also shows falling potted plants. Other photos of the series show Bryant and Jones waiting for a turntable ladder and the moment of the fire escape's collapse with both victims on it. Published originally in the Boston Herald American, the photo was published in more than a hundred newspapers and resulted in the adoption of new fire escape legislation in the United States.

The incident
The tillerman of the first fire engine to arrive at the scene, Robert O'Neill, asked 19-year-old Bryant to lift her two-year-old goddaughter Jones to him on the roof, but Bryant was unable to do so and O'Neill jumped down to help before the ladder could reach them. O'Neill had one arm around Bryant and one hand on a rung of the ladder when the fire escape collapsed. Bryant sustained multiple head and body injuries and died hours later. Jones survived the fall as she had landed on Bryant, softening the impact. A helicopter pilot, Joe Green, who provided traffic reports and landed on a nearby roof, reportedly offered to pick up Bryant and Jones, but got no response from the firefighter.

Police obtained an arrest warrant for the building's owner, Fred Durham, for trash fires behind the building. A police complaint charged Durham with keeping an unlicensed lodging house. Three trash fires behind the building were reported in the weeks preceding the accident.

Forman's recollection
Recalling the accident, Forman said he was about to leave the office of the Boston Herald when, after a call about a fire, he rushed to the scene, following one of the fire engines. Hearing yelling for a ladder truck, Forman ran to the back of the burning building, where he saw Diana Bryant and Tiare Jones on the fire escape. Because of the heat of the fire behind, Bryant and Jones were "basically leaning" at the point farthest from the building. Forman then took a position where he could photograph what he thought was "an impending routine rescue" in his own words. After the fire escape collapse, Forman acknowledged: "It dawned on me what was happening and I didn't want to see them hit the ground. I can still remember turning around and shaking". Forman, however, noted he was unable to see the moment Bryant and Jones hit the ground "as they fell behind a fence where the bins were".

Publication and impact on policy
This photograph and others from the incident were originally published in the Boston Herald. Forman made a set of prints for the Associated Press, which distributed the photo to 128 U.S. newspapers and those in several foreign countries.

Within twenty-four hours, action was taken in Boston to improve the safety of all fire escapes in the city. Fire safety groups used the photos to promote similar efforts in other U.S. cities.

Awards
1975: World Press Photo of the Year
1976: Pulitzer Prize for Spot News Photography

See also
 List of photographs considered the most important

References

Black-and-white photographs
1975 in Massachusetts
History of firefighting
African-American history in Boston
Photographs of the United States
Boston Herald
1975 works
1975 in art
1970s photographs
Pulitzer Prize-winning photographs